34 is the fourth studio album from Dre Murray. Collision Records released the album on November 27, 2015.

Critical reception

Awarding the album four stars at New Release Today, Dwayne Lacy states, "Lyrically this album is incredibly strong, but something seems to be missing." Aubrey J. McKay, reviewing the album from Wade-O Radio, writes, "34 isn’t the best album Dre Murray has in his catalog, but it is definitely one of the better projects of 2015."

Track listing

Chart performance

References

2015 albums
Dre Murray albums